Neil Mitchell (born 8 June 1965) is a Scottish musician, best known as the keyboard player for Wet Wet Wet.

Mitchell was born in Helensburgh, Dunbartonshire.

In June 2010, Mitchell was ordered to take part in a domestic violence programme after he admitted assaulting his girlfriend, Olivia Warren, in July 2009.

References

1965 births
Living people
Wet Wet Wet members
Scottish keyboardists
People from Helensburgh
People educated at Clydebank High School